The "Maccabi youth movement" (HaMaccabi HaTza'ir) is a Zionist youth movement established during the international convention of the Maccabi organization in Prague, Czech Republic in 1929. As the Maccabi movement is involved with promoting physical activity and sports among the Jewish people, the Maccabi youth movement was designated to focus on the physical education of the young generation.

The main values that characterize the movement are Zionism, leadership, good citizenship, friendship among members, persistence and most and for all supporting the community on a self-fulfillment basis.

The Young Maccabi puts an educational effort in helping youth from all around the country to gain better manners and values on the on hand thus contributing to the community on an voluntary spirit in a wide range of services. 

Its uniform includes shirts and pants in bright brown colors, signifying equality and simplicity as well as diversity. The blue folded tie with the 3 white stripes stands for the state of Israel's flag. It also symbolizes the commitment to the values of Zionism.

The movements badge is made of the 2 first letters of its name in Hebrew. They are arranged in the form of the traditional "shield of David". The symbol creates a linkage between the movement and a well known Jewish and Zionist symbol.

During the fore coming years until the formal establishment of the state of Israel, its main activity was in recruiting young Jewish youth as part of the effort to establish the sports system in the emerging new country. Additionally, the young movement played a role in helping young Jewish juvenile in immigrating to Israel from abroad. Furthermore, members of the movement took active part in the settling efforts as well as the defending of the young Jewish settlements. 

As for today, the movement is active in 21 branches that are located throughout the state of Israel. The principal of counseling of older members to the younger ones is still being implemented. 

The Young Makabi movement also activates hikes and field trips to its young members, in order to endow the connection of the young generation to its land. The hikes include training of scouting skills as part of the general movement's apprehension.

During the routine yearly activities the Young Makabi members participate in weekly meetings at the local branches that are spread countrywide. 

As part of the connection to the roots of the nation's forefathers, the Young Makabi started the long lasting tradition of the famed "torch trail". The event is considered as the main highlight of all the Young Makabi events. Since its utilization back in 1944, it is held consecutively ever since. The unique event takes part around Hanukkah, Feast of the Makabis, from which the movement got its name. Members of the movement take part in the unique event. It includes running with the torch through towns and settlements across the country and participating in various educational activities. As part of the mission of developing relations with Jewish communities overseas, local delegations go abroad with a symbolic torch thus distributing the values and principals of the movement.

External links
 Maccabi youth movement official website 

Maccabi World Union
Zionist youth movements